Carinodrillia suimaca is a species of sea snail, a marine gastropod mollusk in the family Pseudomelatomidae, the turrids and allies.

Description
The length of the shell attains 13 mm.

Distribution
This species occurs off Puerto Rico.

References

 Corea, Lois Fleming. Reports on the Collections Obtained by the First Johnson-Smithsonian Deep-Sea Expedition to the Puerto Rican Deep. New Marine Mollusks, Etc. 1934.

External links
 
 
 Corea, Lois Fleming. "New marine mollusks (with three plates)." (1934).

suimaca
Gastropods described in 1934